The 1996 United States Senate election in Massachusetts took place on November 5, 1996. Incumbent Democratic U.S. Senator John Kerry won re-election to a third term over Republican Bill Weld, the Governor of Massachusetts.

General election

Candidates
Susan C. Gallagher	(Conservative)
 John Kerry, incumbent U.S. Senator since 1985 (Democratic)
Robert C. Stowe (Natural Law)
 Bill Weld, Governor of Massachusetts (Republican)

Campaign
On November 29, 1995, incumbent Governor Bill Weld announced his candidacy for the Senate seat occupied by U.S. Senator John Kerry with a formal announcement on March 27, 1996. Kerry's previous two general election opponents in 1984 and 1990 had no prior experience in elected office. 

At the federal level, Democrats controlled both of the state's U.S. Senate seats and eight of its ten U.S. House seats. No Republican had won a Senate election since Ed Brooke in 1972. In 1994, incumbent Democrat Ted Kennedy won re-election against businessman Mitt Romney with 58% of the vote—a comfortable margin, but his lowest percentage of the vote since his first Senate election campaign in 1962. However, Weld, a fiscal conservative and social liberal, was a very popular governor; he had won reelection in 1994 with over 70% of the vote in spite of the state's Democratic lean. Therefore, the general election was expected to be highly competitive. This was one of many competitive U.S. Senate elections in 1996.

The first debate between Weld and Kerry was held in Faneuil Hall on April 8, with a second debate held on June 3. A third debate was held at the Emerson Majestic Theater on July 2. The Weld and Kerry campaigns agreed to eight debates and a spending cap of $6.9 million negotiated at Senator Kerry's Beacon Hill home on August 7; Senator Kerry later mortgaged his house to raise funds in October. On the same day the spending cap was agreed upon, Governor Weld jumped into the Charles River. He later spoke at the 1996 Republican National Convention on August 14 before debating Senator Kerry again on August 19. Senator Kerry spoke at the 1996 Democratic National Convention and debated Governor Weld again on September 16.

Results

See also 
 1996 United States presidential election
 1996 United States Senate elections

References

External links
 Kerry-Weld debates of 1996
 "The Good Fight" by James Carney
 Kranish, Michael, Brian C. Mooney, and Nina J. Easton. John F. Kerry: The Complete Biography by the Boston Globe Reporters Who Know Him Best, PublicAffairs, 2004. .

Massachusetts
John Kerry
Bill Weld
1996
1996 Massachusetts elections